Admiral Arthur Herbert, 1st Earl of Torrington (c. 1648 – 13 April 1716) was an English admiral and politician. Dismissed by King James II in 1688 for refusing to vote to repeal the Test Act, which prevented Roman Catholics from holding public office, he brought the Invitation to William to the Prince of Orange at The Hague, disguised as a simple sailor. As a reward he was made commander of William's invasion fleet which landed at Torbay in Devon on 5 November 1688 thus initiating the Glorious Revolution.

Early life
Born the son of Sir Edward Herbert and Margaret Smith, daughter of Thomas Smith, Herbert joined the Royal Navy in 1663. He was appointed a lieutenant in the third-rate HMS Defiance and saw action at the St. James's Day Battle in July 1666 during the Second Anglo-Dutch War. 

Promoted to post-captain in 1666, he was given command of the fifth-rate HMS Pembroke in April 1667, of the fourth-rate HMS Constant Warwick in September 1668 and of the fourth-rate HMS Dragon in May 1672. 

He went on to captain the third-rate HMS Dreadnought in spring 1672 and commanded her at the Battle of Solebay in May 1672 during the Franco-Dutch War. After that he took command of the third-rate HMS Cambridge in October 1673 and was severely injured while commanding her at the Battle of Schooneveld in June 1673. He commissioned the third-rate HMS Rupert in February 1678, and then commanded a squadron tasked with defending Tangier from the Moors in December 1679.

Flag officer

Herbert was appointed Rear-admiral of England in 1683 and Master of the Robes in 1685. These employments brought him in £4,000 a year. However, when King James II required him to promise that he would vote for the repeal of the Test Act, which prevented Roman Catholics from holding public office, his answer was "that his honour and conscience would not permit him to give any such pledge". The King replied: "Nobody doubts your honour, but a man who lives as you do ought not to talk about his conscience". To this reproach (which came from a bad grace from the lover of Catherine Sedley) Herbert replied: "I have my faults, sir; but I could name people who talk much more about conscience than I am in the habit of doing, and yet lead lives as loose as mine." The King immediately dismissed him from all his offices.

Herbert went to Holland in June 1688, carrying the Invitation to William, and offered his services to the Prince of Orange at The Hague. The Prince appointed him commander-in-chief of the fleet which would take him to England. Following the Glorious Revolution, Herbert became Lord High Admiral and then, when the post of Lord High Admiral had been put into commission, he became First Lord of the Admiralty and Senior Naval Lord on the Board of Admiralty in March 1689. He was raised to the peerage by the new King William III as Earl of Torrington and Baron Herbert of Torbay in May 1689, following on his command of the English squadron at the Battle of Bantry Bay. He was credited with being the first to use the expression, "fleet in being". He proposed avoiding a set battle, except under very favourable conditions, until the arrival of reinforcements: by maintaining his fleet in being, he would force the French to remain in the area and prevent them from undertaking other operations.

Herbert commanded the English and Dutch fleets at the Battle of Beachy Head in July 1690, a serious defeat for the allied fleet, in the Nine Years' War. He was imprisoned in the Tower of London and was court-martialed for failing to support the Dutch van squadron against the French, but was acquitted. Nevertheless, he lost his position as First Lord of the Admiralty, and took no further part in public life. The stories that Torrington was not a popular commander, because of his reputation of being a drunk and his habit of taking several prostitutes with him to sea, have been discredited. 

In 1696, he acquired Oatlands Park, an estate forfeited by his brother, Sir Edward Herbert, who had followed King James II into exile. He died on 13 April 1716 without children, rendering his titles extinct, and was buried in Westminster Abbey.

Marriages
Torrington married twice, but had no issue by either wife:
Firstly to Anne Hadley, from whom he later separated;
Secondly to the twice widowed Anne (dowager Lady Crew), daughter and co-heiress of Sir William Airmine, 2nd Baronet.

See also
 List of deserters from King James II to William of Orange

References

Sources

Burke's Extinct Peerages: TORRINGTON, E

|-

|-

1640s births
1716 deaths
17th-century Royal Navy personnel
Arthur, Earl of Torrington
Earls in the Peerage of England
Peers of England created by William III
East Yorkshire Regiment officers
Lords of the Admiralty
Royal Navy admirals
English MPs 1685–1687
English MPs 1689–1690
Members of the Parliament of England for Dover
Members of the Parliament of England for Plymouth
Lord High Admirals of England